Agostino Centurione (Genoa, 25 November 1584 - Genoa, 7 December 1657) was the 110th Doge of the Republic of Genoa and king of Corsica.

Biography 
His dogal mandate is remembered in the annals for the strong work of opposition and crushing of the ever more numerous gangs of brigands led, among others, also by exited Genoese patricians. Among the public works there is the large wall of the moat of San Tommaso useful for supplying water to the Lagaccio powder factory. After the end of the Dogate on 23 August 1652, he was appointed perpetual procurator, later dean of the Inquisitors of State and, in January 1653, dean of the war magistrate until 1654. In that year he resigned from office to definitively leave public life for religious life, a choice that his father had already taken as an elder entering the Barnabites order. After initial attempts to dissuade him from the action by his sister Vittoria, Agostino Centurione entered the Society of Jesus, carrying out his novitiate in Chieri. Centurione died in Genoa on December 7, 1657.

See also 

 Republic of Genoa
 Doge of Genoa

Sources 

 Buonadonna, Sergio. Rosso doge. I dogi della Repubblica di Genova dal 1339 al 1797.

17th-century Doges of Genoa
1584 births
1657 deaths